Evolution Theory may refer to:

 Evolution theory, change in the heritable characteristics of biological populations over successive generations
 Evolution Theory (Candy Lo album)
 Evolution Theory (Modestep album)